Cruzeiro Futebol Clube, commonly known as Cruzeiro, is a Brazilian football club based in Cruz das Almas, Bahia state.

History
The club was founded on September 26, 1967. Cruzeiro won the Campeonato Baiano Second Level in 1998.

Achievements

 Campeonato Baiano Second Level:
 Winners (1): 1998

Stadium
Cruzeiro Futebol Clube play their home games at Estádio Municipal Carmelito Barbosa Alves, nicknamed Barbosão. The stadium has a maximum capacity of 8,000 people.

References

Association football clubs established in 1967
Football clubs in Bahia
1967 establishments in Brazil